Balacra similis is a moth of the family Erebidae. It was described by Gustaaf Hulstaert in 1923. It is found in the Democratic Republic of the Congo.

References

Balacra
Moths described in 1923
Insects of the Democratic Republic of the Congo
Erebid moths of Africa
Endemic fauna of the Democratic Republic of the Congo